A declaration of war is a formal act by which one nation goes to war against another.  A declaration is usually an act of delivering a performative speech (not to be confused with a mere speech) or the presentation of a signed document by an authorized party of a national government in order to create a state of war between two or more sovereign states. In the context of World War I, the official international protocol for declaring war was defined in the Hague Convention of 1907 (or Hague II). For the diplomatic maneuvering behind these events, which led to hostilities between nations, see Diplomatic history of World War I.

List of war declarations
Below is a table showing the outbreaks of wars between nations which occurred during World War I. Indicated are the dates (during the immediate build-up to, or during the course of, World War I) from which a de facto state of war existed between nations. The table shows both the initiator states and the state at which the declaration of war was aimed. Events listed include those in which there were a simple diplomatic breaking of relations that did not involve any physical attack, as well as those involving overt declarations or acts of aggression.

See also 

 United Kingdom declaration of war upon Germany (1914)
 United States declaration of war on Germany (1917)
 United States declaration of war on Austria-Hungary

References

 
declaration
World War I-related lists
Modern history timelines